Adrammelech  (Adramélekh) is an ancient Semitic god mentioned briefly by name in the Book of Kings, where he is described as a god of "Sepharvaim". Sepharvaim (a word which is grammatically dual) is commonly, but not certainly, identified with the twin cities of Sippar Yahrurum and Sippar Amnanum on the banks of the Euphrates, north of Babylon. The name Adrammelech probably translates to "Magnificent king."

He was known in the Akkadian language as Arda-Mulissu, and was the rebellious son of Sennacherib.)

Historical background

Biblical account

 reports: "The Sepharvites burned their children in the fire as sacrifices to Adrammelech and Anammelech, the gods of Sepharvaim" (NIV). The Sepharvites are given as a people deported by the Assyrians to Samaria. Adrammelech and the god Anammelech (about whom likewise little is known) are again seemingly alluded to in : "Where are the gods of Hamath and Arpad? Where are the gods of Sepharvaim, Hena and Ivvah? Have they rescued Samaria from my hand?" (NIV).  has an almost identical passage.

Interpretation

According to A. R. Millard, Saul Olyan, and others, Adrammelech likely represents an original ʾAddîr-meleḵ, "majestic king" or "the majestic one is king". Cognate ʾAddîr-milk, along with similar Milk-ʾaddîr (with the morphemes inverted) and Baʿal-ʾaddîr ("majestic master" or "majestic Baal"), is recorded in ancient Semitic sources as an epithet of Baal, or a baal.

Adrammelech is commonly understood as a companion of Anammelech, due to their association in 2 Kings 17, the similarity of their names, and the similarity of their worship through child sacrifice.

Before the identification with epigraphic ʾAddîr-milk, various attempts (since generally rejected) were made to interpret the origin of the name Adrammelech.

The reconstructed form *Adar-malik (or the variant *Adru-malku) was once almost universally accepted as the original Akkadian form of the name. For example, Eberhard Schrader wrote in 1885:

Adad is in fact recorded as a variant of Hadad; but Millard writes: "If the Sepharvites were of Aramean or Phoenician origin, it is very unlikely that the name of their god would have lost its initial h, unless the Hebrew authors of Kings copied the information from a cuneiform text in Babylonian, which would not express it."

At the turn of the century, William Muss-Arnolt suggested that ʾAḏrammeleḵ could represent his own reconstructed Akkadian *Atra-malik, comparing the form to the names Atra-ḫasis and *(A)tar-ilu, writing, "Atra-malik would probably yield ."

In the Talmud

From the Jewish Encyclopedia:

Demonology

Like many pagan gods, Adrammelech is considered a demon in some Judeo-Christian traditions. So he appears in Milton's Paradise Lost, where he is a fallen angel who, along with Asmodeus, is vanquished by Uriel and Raphael. According to Collin de Plancy's book on demonology, Infernal Dictionary, Adrammelech became the President of the Senate of the demons. He is also the Chancellor of Hell and supervisor of Satan's wardrobe. He is generally depicted with a human torso, a mule's head, a peacock tail, and the limbs of a mule or peacock.
In the Ars Goetia, he was known as Andrealphus.

In fiction
A poet's description of Adrammelech (spelled Adramelech as in Greek) can be found in Robert Silverberg's short story "Basileus". He is described as "The enemy of God, greater in ambition, guile and mischief than Satan. A fiend more curst—a deeper hypocrite."

An attempt to summon Adrammelech (spelled Adramelech throughout) is central to the plot of Graham Masterton's 1978 horror novel "The Devils of D Day".

Adrammelech, (again spelled 'Adramelech') is depicted as a goat-headed demon and boss enemy in the Game Boy Advance video game, Castlevania: Circle of the Moon, where he must be destroyed in order to complete the game.

Adrammelech is a boss and occasional summonable monster in the Final Fantasy series, first appearing in Final Fantasy Tactics.

See also
Anammelech
Baal
Christian demons in popular culture
List of biblical figures identified in extra-biblical sources

References

Books of Kings
Deities in the Hebrew Bible
Mesopotamian gods
Demons in Christianity
Sippar